Carl Township may refer to the following townships in the United States:

 Carl Township, Adams County, Iowa
 Carl Township, McPherson County, South Dakota